Saint-Bonnet-du-Gard (Provençal: Sent Bonet del Gard) is a commune in the Gard department in southern France.

Population

Gallery

See also
Communes of the Gard department

References

Communes of Gard